The list of ship commissionings in 1996 includes a chronological list of all ships commissioned in 1996.


See also 

1996
 Ship commissionings